Loredana Elena Toma (born 10 May 1995) is a Romanian weightlifter, two time World Champion and four time European Champion competing in the 58 kg and 63 kg categories until 2018 and 64 kg starting in 2018 after the International Weightlifting Federation reorganized the categories. In 2014 she tested positive for Stanozolol and was banned for two years by the International Weightlifting Federation.

Career

World Championships
After winning the 2017 European Weightlifting Championships she competed at the 2017 World Weightlifting Championships in the 63 kg division. She won gold medals in the snatch, clean & jerk and total, finishing with a total of 237 kg, a full 12 kg over the silver medalist Lina Rivas. She won the 2022 World Weightlifting Championships in the 71kg division, snatching a new world record of 119kg and clean and jerking 137kg for a total of 256kg.

European Championships
After winning two silver medals in the 58 kg categories at the 2013 and 2014 European Weightlifting Championships she moved up weight classes to the 63 kg in 2017. At the 2017 European Weightlifting Championships she won gold medals in all lifts to win her first European Championship.

In 2018, fresh off of a World Championships gold medal, she competed at the 2018 European Weightlifting Championships in her home country of Romania. She again won gold medals in all lifts, with her final total of 236 kg being 17 kg over the silver medalist Irina Lepșa, and 6 kg over the gold medallist of the next highest (69 kg) category.

Major results

References

External links
 
 

1995 births
Living people
Sportspeople from Botoșani
Romanian female weightlifters
World Weightlifting Championships medalists
European Weightlifting Championships medalists
21st-century Romanian women